Big Spring is an unincorporated community in Meigs County, Tennessee, United States. It is located along Tennessee State Route 58 between Georgetown and Decatur, approximately two miles north of the banks of the Hiwassee River.

Notes

Unincorporated communities in Meigs County, Tennessee
Unincorporated communities in Tennessee